The Picacho is the highest mountain near Bucaramanga City. It is located 35 miles from Bucaramanga, reaching a height of 3400 meters.

Mountains of Colombia